The Segamat railway station is a Malaysian train station located at and named after the town of Segamat, Segamat District, Johor.

This station provides KTM Intercity train services. Adjacent to the railway station is the bus & taxi terminal.

History
The station was originally established in 1909. In 1924, the station building was reconstructed with a bigger building on the same place. The old station will be demolished to make way for a new station to be constructed as part of the Gemas-Johor Bahru Double Tracking and Electrification Project.

Around the station
 Pejabat Penerangan Daerah Segamat
 Segamat Roundabout

References

External links
 Segamat KTM Railway Station

Railway stations in Johor
KTM ETS railway stations
Segamat District